Maksim Sergeyevich Batov (born 5 June 1992) is a Russian football player. He plays for FC Dynamo Saint Petersburg.

Club career
He made his debut in the Russian Second Division for FC Chernomorets Novorossiysk on 9 September 2012 in a game against FC Biolog-Novokubansk Progress.

He made his Russian Premier League debut for FC Amkar Perm on 9 March 2015 in a game against FC Torpedo Moscow.

He appeared in Europa League qualifiers in 2015 for FC Rubin Kazan.

References

External links
 Career summary by sportbox.ru  
 
 
 

1992 births
Living people
Sportspeople from Perm, Russia
Russian footballers
Russia youth international footballers
Association football defenders
FC Chernomorets Novorossiysk players
FC Amkar Perm players
FC Rubin Kazan players
FC Orenburg players
FC Anzhi Makhachkala players
FC Khimki players
FC Luch Vladivostok players
FC Tekstilshchik Ivanovo players
FC Leningradets Leningrad Oblast players
FC Zenit Saint Petersburg players
FC Zenit-2 Saint Petersburg players
FC Dynamo Saint Petersburg players
Russian Premier League players
Russian First League players
Russian Second League players